Bedi may refer to:

People

Indian heritage or association
 Bedi clan, clan in India
 Aadya Bedi (active from 1999), Indian theater artist and Bollywood actress
 Angad Bedi (born 1983), Indian actor and model
 Ankush Bedi (born 1991), Indian cricketer
 Bishan Singh Bedi (born 1946), Indian cricketer
 Daya Singh Bedi (18991975), Indian diplomat, civil servant, and cavalry officer in the British Indian Army
 Freda Bedi (191177), British-born Tibetan Buddhist nun
 H. S. Bedi (born 1946), Indian judge
 H. S. Bedi (entrepreneur) (born 1952), Indian army officer, subsequently a businessman
 Kabir Bedi (born 1946), Indian television and film actor
 Kiran Bedi (born 1949), Indian politician, social activist, and former tennis player and police officer
 Kunwar Mohinder Singh Bedi Sahar (1920after 1983), Indian Urdu poet
 Mandira Bedi (active from 1994), Indian actress, fashion designer, model and television presenter
 Manek Bedi (active between 19962007), Indian film actor
 Mitter Bedi (192685), Indian photographer
 Monica Bedi (born 1975), Indian actress and television presenter
 Narendra Bedi (193782) Indian Bollywood film director, son of Rajinder Singh Bedi
 Naresh Bedi (born before 1972), Indian wildlife film maker and photographer
 Nikki Bedi (born 1966), British television and radio presenter
 Nripjit Singh Bedi (AKA Nippy Bedi, born 1940), Indian volleyball player
 Pooja Bedi (born 1970), Indian Bollywood actress and television talk show host
 Protima Bedi (194898), Indian model turned Odissi exponent
 Purva Bedi (born 1974), Indian-born American actress
 Rajat Bedi (active from 1998), Indian film actor
 Rajinder Singh Bedi (191584), Indian writer and playwright in Urdu, and film director, screenwriter and dialogue writer in Hindi
 Rakesh Bedi (active from 1979), Indian actor, stage and television actor
 Raman Bedi (active from 1996), English academic and organiser in the field of dental care
 Sanjeet Bedi (2015), Indian television actor
 Sarah Bedi (born before 1999), British actress
 Sarla Bedi (19252013), Indian priestess who spent life in three continents
 Susham Bedi (born 1945), Indian author of novels, short stories and poetry
 Vijay Bedi (born before 2005), Indian wildlife film maker and photographer

Other heritage or association
 Bedi Buval (born 1986), Martiniquais professional footballer
 Martial Bedi Esmel (born 1986), Ivorian football player
 Mbenza Bedi (Hugues Bedi Mbenza, born 1984), Congolese footballer
 Tamocha Bedi (active from 2001), Botswana footballer
 Tibor Bédi (born 1974), Hungarian hurdler who competed at the 2000 Summer Olympics

Places and structures 
 Bedi, Gujarat, a census town in Jamnagar district, India
 Bedi Mahal, a palace situated in Kallar Syedan, Rawalpindi District, Punjab, Pakistan
 Chak Bedi, a historical town of Pakpattan, a district in Punjab

See also 
 Bedi Kartlisa, an academic journal specializing in the language, literature, history and art of Georgia (Kartvelology) 194884
 Bidugadeya Bedi, a 1985 Kannada film
 Kannadadda Kiran Bedi, a 2009 Kannada action drama film
 

Surnames of Indian origin
Surnames of Hungarian origin

                                                                                                                                  -->